"Waitin' for the Deal to Go Down" is a song written by Charlie Black, Bobby Fischer, and Austin Roberts. It was first recorded by Reba McEntire on her 1990 album Rumor Has It.

It was later the debut single for American country music group Dixiana.  It was released in February 1992 as the first single from the album Dixiana.  The song reached #39 on the Billboard Hot Country Singles & Tracks chart.

Chart performance

References

1992 debut singles
1990 songs
Reba McEntire songs
Dixiana (band) songs
Songs written by Charlie Black
Songs written by Austin Roberts (singer)
Song recordings produced by Bob Montgomery (songwriter)
Epic Records singles